Ihor Ivanovych Leonov  (born 17 September 1967) is a Ukrainian former professional football midfielder and manager.

On 6 October 2011 he was appointed as interim coach for Illichivets Mariupol after resignation of the next coach, Valeriy Yaremchenko.

Honours
Ukrainian Premier League:  runner-up 4
1994, 1997, 1998, 1999
Ukrainian Cup: 2
1995, 1997

References

External links
 
 

1967 births
Living people
People from Kerch
Soviet footballers
Ukrainian footballers
Association football midfielders
FC Okean Kerch players
SC Tavriya Simferopol players
FC Shakhtar Donetsk players
FC Shakhtar-2 Donetsk players
SKN St. Pölten players
Floridsdorfer AC players
FC Kremin Kremenchuk players
FC Metalurh Donetsk players
FC Zorya Luhansk players
FC Volgar Astrakhan players
FC SOYUZ-Gazprom Izhevsk players
FC Monolit Kostiantynivka players
Soviet Second League players
Soviet Top League players
Austrian Football Bundesliga players
Austrian Regionalliga players
Ukrainian Premier League players
Ukrainian First League players
Ukrainian Second League players
Ukrainian Amateur Football Championship players
Russian First League players
Ukrainian expatriate footballers
Expatriate footballers in Austria
Ukrainian expatriate sportspeople in Austria
Expatriate footballers in Russia
Ukrainian expatriate sportspeople in Russia
Ukrainian football managers
Ukrainian Second League managers
Ukrainian Premier League managers
FC Mariupol managers
FC Shakhtar-3 Donetsk managers
FC Arsenal Kyiv managers
FC Mynai managers
FC Nyva Vinnytsia managers